Frédéric Lepage is a French author, film writer and producer of several hundred programs and documentaries.

Career

Literary career 
Frédéric Lepage is a best-selling author of novels such as La Fin du septième jour or La Mémoire interdite, published in numerous countries including France, Germany, Japan and Greece. He has also written essays on various subjects from science (Les Jumeaux: enquête) to gastronomy (A table avec Chirac) with a detour for an anthology of the world's most beautiful prayers.

In 2008 he created a series of fiction books for children, Micah et les voix de la jungle, which at this writing has four volumes: Le Camp des éléphants, La Malédiction de Mara, Le Masque du serpent and Piège de sang. This series won several awards and literary prizes. There will be five volumes.

In March 2011 his novel Le Colloque des bonobos (Editions Balland) was published. This work asks the question: are chimpanzees and human genetically similar to the extent that they must be placed on the same evolutionary branch? The author imagined a conference organized to respond to the question. Experts from Africa debating the question are all… chimpanzees. They must decide if they will accept to become brothers to humans. This novel is based on scientific research validated by Sandrine Prat, paleontologist in charge of research at the French National Centre for Scientific Research.

Audiovisual career 
Frédéric Lepage began his career as a television writer and producer at TF1. Following a stint at Antenne 2, he created his own company XL Productions. The company quickly grew and was innovative notably in the domain of documentary films. The company produced a wide range of programming: giant concerts (Fête de la Musique for TF1), TV variety shows, literary magazines (Ex-Libris) or the game show Dessinez, c’est gagné. In 1990 the company launched the children's program Disney Club with The Walt Disney Company. Later, Frédéric Lepage ran the documentary department of the Group Télé Images.

Frédéric Lepage makes his mark in the domain of large scale documentary series, such as in 1996 with Untamed Africa, a team effort with the director Laurent Frapat. This twelve-hour series, touted by reviewers, was a success in more than one hundred countries. Other Untamed followed, forming a cycle of close to sixty films and one of the biggest commercial successes in the domain of wildlife films: Untamed Amazonia, Untamed Australia, Untamed Asia, Untamed America.

Concurrently with his Untamed or previous to them, Frédéric Lepage wrote and produced other series such as Les Sanctuaires sauvages, Tant qu’il y aura des bêtes directed by Jean-Baptiste Erreca, Les Nouveaux sanctuaires, Blue Beyond, Les Nuits sauvages, Super Plants and Genesis II et l’homme créa la nature, directed by Jean-Baptiste Erreca and Laurent Frapat. Artists such as Anggun or actors John Hurt, Lambert Wilson, Pierre Arditi, Brian Cox and Tcheky Karyo collaborated on these projects.

In 2005, Frédéric Lepage wrote and produced Brûlez Rome ! a docu-fiction that takes the audience to Rome behind the scenes in the time of Nero's empire. This production featured thousands of supernumerary actors and a meticulous reconstruction of first century Rome erected in the Tunisian desert.

In 2009 and 2010, Frédéric Lepage wrote and produced Extinctions, a six-hour international documentary coproduction on the mechanisms of the extinction of several emblematic species. This series success led him to write and produce the sequel in six episodes, entitled Saved from Extinction.

In 2011, he wrote and produced Last Chance Tiger and in 2012 Six Feet Under the Savannah, Requiem for an Elephant, Norin's Ark and The Funny Side of Science.

Frédéric Lepage is also the author-director of a successful political film, A table avec les politiques, which depicts how we can deduct politicians’ eating habits from their ideological orientations. Another film in the same series, Political Animals was aired in 2010 on France 3.

The group led by Frédéric Lepage, comprising the companies Jukurpa Media, FL Concepts & co and Stratus Factory, bought the press agency Interscoop in 2010 which was created in 1983 by Frédéric Laffont and Christophe de Ponfilly. Frédéric Lepage also owns a musical publishing company, A440 Publishing.

Released in France in December 2008, Sunny and the Elephant is Frédéric Lepage's first feature film. A sweeping adventure film destined for international and family audiences. It was shot regions of Thailand near Burma. The soundtrack was composed by Joe Hisaishi.

Additional information 
Frédéric Lepage is a member of the Institut et du Séminaire Multi-Médias (promotion Jean Renoir).

Beginning in December 1993, Frédéric Lepage was named to a committee of four experts mandated by the Ministre de la Communication to develop the project Chaîne de la Connaissance launched in 1994 under the name La Cinquième and known today as the channel, France 5.

As part of his work with the company Le Public Système, Frédéric Lepage was one of the organizers of the Festival mondial du film d’aventure de Manaus (Brazil) for several years. His company FL Concepts acts as a consultant for a certain number of well-known individuals, groups and public communities on their image and communication strategy.

Private life 
Frédéric Lepage lives in Paris and Bangkok.

Over the years he became knowledgeable about China and Southeast Asian civilizations, and he is a member of the Siam Society.

Notes 

Living people
French television writers
French television producers
Year of birth missing (living people)
Place of birth missing (living people)
French male writers
Male screenwriters
Male television writers